The Dongfeng 5 or DF-5 is a second-generation two stage Chinese intercontinental ballistic missile. It has a length of 32.6 m and a diameter of 3.35 m. It weighs in at 183,000 kilograms and it has an estimated range of 12,000 to 15,000 kilometers. The DF-5 had its first flight in 1971 and was in operational service 10 years later. One of the limitations of the missile is that it takes between 30 and 60 minutes to fuel. The DF-5 is due to be replaced by the solid-fuelled DF-41. Around 2015, the newest variant DF-5B force are believed to have received a MIRV upgrade; according to Business Insider, with DF-5B: "China has the ability to deliver nuclear warheads nearly anywhere on earth (outside of South America, at least)".

History

The DF-5 was designed under the leadership of Tu Shou'e [屠守锷]] at the China Academy of Launch Technology (CALT); Li Xu'e [李绪鄂] served as deputy chief designer. The missile was produced at the China's Factory 211 (Capital Astronautics Co. [首都航天机械公司], also known as the Capital Machine Factory [首都机械厂]).

The DF-5 was first flight tested in 1971, with final tests into the Pacific Ocean in May 1980. Two silo-based missiles were put into 'trial operational deployment' in 1981. It had a range of 10,000 to 12,000 km which allowed it to threaten the western portions of the United States. Beginning in 1986 the Chinese started developing the improved DF-5A, with range increased to over 15,000 km and a more accurate guidance system. The DF-5A upgrade increased the throw-weight of the system from 3,000 kg to 3,200 kg.

Deployment

As with the DF-4, initially the DF-5 was stored in a horizontal position in tunnels under high mountains, and are launched immediately outside the mouth of the tunnel. The missiles must be moved into the open and fueled prior to firing, an operational mode dubbed chu men fang pao (firing a cannon outdoors), with the fueling operation apparently requiring about two hours. The initial deployment of a pair of DF-5s in silos in Central China was completed in 1981. That portion of the DF-5A force that is deployed in silos could be maintained in a ready-to-fire status. In order to enhance the survivability of these missiles, China has constructed a large number of decoy silos which consist of shallow holes excavations with headworks that resemble operational silos.

According to the US National Air and Space Intelligence Center, as of 1998 the deployed DF-5 force consisted of "about 25" missiles. From early 1999 to 2008 the total deployed DF-5 force was generally estimated at about 20 missiles. As of 2017, there were about 20 operational DF-5 launchers.

Variants

DF-5B 
According to a 2015 US report, Business Insider, Jane's Defence Weekly, and The Diplomat, China had begun to MIRV its DF-5s. It is believed about three to eight warheads can be placed on each MIRVed missile.

An improved version, named DF-5B, was shown to the public during the parade in Beijing celebrating 70 years since the end of World War II on 3 September 2015. By that time, the DoD estimated China of having approximately 20 DF-5 ICBMs, with 10 of them being DF-5B variants containing MIRVs. Although China has had the technology to field MIRV warheads for decades, they have only recently begun to do so, likely in response to the development of the American ballistic missile defense system. The DF-5B supposedly has an increased throw weight of 5000 kg.

DF-5C 
China has begun testing a new variant of a DF-5 missile, which has a MIRV with 10 nuclear warheads. It is called the DF-5C.

Gallery

Operators 
 :  The People's Liberation Army Rocket Force is the only operator of the DF-5.

See also
SS-18
Titan II

References

External links
 CSIS Missile Threat - Dong Feng 5 A/B
 DF-5

1971 in spaceflight
Intercontinental ballistic missiles of the People's Republic of China
Weapons of the People's Republic of China
Nuclear missiles of the People's Republic of China
Military equipment introduced in the 1980s